The Forest People (1961) is Colin Turnbull's ethnographic study of the Mbuti pygmies of the Uturi Forest in then-Belgian Congo.

In this book, the British-American anthropologist detailed his three years spent with the community in the late 1950s. The style is informal and accessible. Turnbull contrasts his forest-living subjects' lifestyle with that of nearby town-dwelling Africans and evaluates the interactions of the two groups.

The editor for the book was Michael Korda who attended Oxford University with Turnbull.

The Forest People was the version for a general readership of Turnbull's academic thesis, which was published in an expanded, more technical form by Routledge in London as Wayward Servants: The Two Worlds of the African Pygmies (1965). Turnbull wrote about his experiences with the tribe from a first person perspective. The Mbuti tribe respected him, and attempted to show him their cultural prospects as a society until a drastic change in their lifestyles occurred.

References

External links 
  Smithsonian listing of documentary footage of the area and communities described in the book
 BaMbuti Pygmies @ National Geographic Magazine National Geographic Feature in September 2005

Anthropology books
1961 non-fiction books
African Pygmies
Simon & Schuster books
Belgian Congo
Books about the Democratic Republic of the Congo